Dil Ne Phir Yaad Kiya is a 1966 Bollywood film. It stars Dharmendra, Nutan, Rehman and Jeevan. The music is by Sonik Omi. It has double role of both Dharmendra and Nutan.

Theme
The story of the eternal friendship between two men, 'Dil Ne Phir Yaad Kiya' is a musical classic. Ashok (Dharmendra) and Amjad (Rehman) are thick friends. This movie showcases their immense loyalty and selfless friendship.

Plot
City-based Ashok, who works as a Salesman in a toy store, has always dreamt of marrying village-based Ashoo. He is a close friend of his co-worker, Amjad, whose marriage is being finalized with Shabnam. Ashok goes to the village to meet and gets Ashoo to marry him but finds she has been abducted by his brother, Bhagat, who had earlier killed her brother, Bhagwan. Ashok manages to rescue her and they flee from Bhagat and his goons in order to try and reach Amjad's wedding ceremony. Amjad is ready to even postpone the wedding in order to give Ashok enough time to make it but nothing will prepare him for the shock when he gets the news that the train in Ashok and Ashoo were traveling in had met with an accident - with very few survivors. Later, Amjad finds Ashok but Ashoo dies. Coincidentally, Shabnam  looks exactly like Ashoo and he asks Shabnam to pretend to be Ashoo, only so that his friend could recover and be healthy again. Shabnam reluctantly agrees but Ashok, who is unaware of Ashoo's death, is frustrated to see that Ashoo no longer loves him like before and retreats back even when he holds her hand. Will he realize Amjad's love for him and will Shabnam ever gain her husband's love? The film ends with the answers to these questions.

Cast
 Dharmendra as Ashok / Bhola (Tun Tun's Husband)
 Nutan as Ashoo / Shabnam
 Jeevan as Bhagat		
 Rehman as Amjad	
 I. S. Johar as Bhagwan		
 Sunder as Aashiq
 Tun Tun as Premkali
 Laxmi Chhaya as Dancer / Singer
 Bela Bose as Honey

The music direction for this film was by the debutante music composer duo Sonik Omi whereas the lyrics for all the songs were by G.L. Rawal.

Soundtrack
Lyrics by: G. L. Rawal

External links
 

1966 films
Films scored by Sonik-Omi
1960s Hindi-language films